Don Palathara is a film director, screenwriter, and documentary filmmaker from Kerala, India. Known for working on small budgets, his films are expositions of local Kerala culture and study on the human nature. Palathara's films have gained accolades at several international film festivals, including Moscow International Film Festival, International Film Festival Rotterdam and International Film Festival of Kerala.

Early life 
Don Palathara was born and raised in Kerala, India. He subsequently migrated to Sydney, Australia, where he received a diploma from the Academy of Film, Theatre and Television in Sydney, which was formerly known as the International Film School Sydney, before its merger with Actors College of Theatre and Television.

Career 
Palathara had made several short films and documentaries, before venturing into feature films. In 2015, his first movie, Shavam, was released. Made on a small budget, the film was noted for its atypical filmmaking choices, as it was made entirely in black and white, used location recording of sound (unusual for Indian movies), and a large number of inexperienced actors. The film, which is a satire exploring aspects of human character and set at the scene of a funeral, was well received in international film festivals, and garnered positive responses locally as well. When the film was released, it was distributed using Kazhcha Film Forum's Cinema Vandi, an alternative film distribution mechanism Later, Shavam was presented on Netflix and MUBI.

In 2017, Palathara wrote, directed, produced, and edited his second feature film, Vith. The movie was financed through crowdfunding platforms, including Kickstarter and from the proceeds of Shavam, a method of film finance rapidly gaining popularity amongst younger filmmakers.

His next film, 1956, Central Travancore, wasr premiered at Moscow International Film Festival. In 2022, '1956, Central Travancore' bagged FFSI's John Abraham Award for the best film of 2020.

In 2020, Palathara made the film Santhoshathinte Onnam Rahasyam featuring Rima Kallingal and Jitin Puthanchery, which is an 85-min single-take car ride taken by a young journalist and an aspiring actor. This film was later nominated for Golden George for best film at the 43rd Moscow International Film Festival.

His Everything Is Cinema, a relationship drama presented in first person narrative, featuring only Sherin Catherine had its premiere at the 50th International Film Festival Rotterdam in the Cinema Regained section.

In 2022, he made FAMILY, which stars Vinay Forrt, Divya Prabha, Nilja K Baby, Mathew Thomas, Sajitha Madathil etc. The film is an official selection at the International Film Festival Rotterdam.

Filmography

References

External links 
 Official Website
 Don Palathara on IMDb

Film directors from Kerala
Malayalam film directors
Living people
1986 births